Sefwi Bekwai is a small town in Bibiani Anhwiaso Bekwai District in the Western Region of Ghana.

References

Populated places in the Western Region (Ghana)